Empress Xiaogangkuang (died 1662) was a Chinese empress consort of the Southern Ming, empress to the Yongli Emperor. She converted to Roman Catholicism and adopted the name Anne.

References

|-

Southern Ming empresses
Year of birth unknown
1662 deaths
People from Suzhou
Chinese Roman Catholics
Converts to Roman Catholicism
17th-century Chinese women
17th-century Chinese people